The Maeotic Swamp was the name formerly given to the swampy land surrounding the Strait of Kerch, which joins the Sea of Azov and the Black Sea.

References

Landforms of Crimea
Wetlands of Ukraine
Swamps of Russia